Karen Lee Andrews (born 27 October 1981) is an Australian singer and multi-instrumentalist, formerly known by her stage name Ms Murphy.

Career 
Andrews appeared as finalist on the second season of The Voice in 2013.

Andrews debut EP, White Dress and the Spirit, was released in January 2014. This was followed by Stride in October 2014.

Andrews debut album Dirty Soul Live from the Rec Studio was released on 8 August 2015. It debuted at number 73 on the Australian ARIA Albums Chart and at number 2 on the ARIA Jazz Album Charts.

In 2018, Andrews released Far From Paradise.

Andrews has appeared as a support act and backup singer for Australian singer Jimmy Barnes on several occasions, including for the They're Shutting Down Your Town tour in 2019 and the Soul Deep 30 tour in 2022. During Barnes' Soul Deep 30 tour, Andrews sang a duet of Wilson Pickett's In the Midnight Hour with Barnes. Prior to singing this song on 16 June Barnes stated that Andrews had been "adopted" by his family, and on 25 June, Barnes complimented Andrews by saying that, while his voice could be loud, the power of her voice made his voice sound "like a fly" at rehearsals. On the same night, Andrews also spoke about Barnes' generosity in allowing her to use his home studio to record an upcoming album, and how she received assistance from Barnes' daughter Mahalia Barnes and Mahalia's husband Ben Rodgers on vocals and album production respectively.

Discography

Studio albums

Extended plays

References

External links 
 
 
 

1981 births
Living people
21st-century Australian singers
21st-century Australian women singers